In (unconstrained) mathematical optimization, a backtracking line search is a line search method to determine the amount to move along a given search direction. Its use requires that the objective function is differentiable and that its gradient is known.

The method involves starting with a relatively large estimate of the step size for movement along the line search direction, and iteratively shrinking the step size (i.e., "backtracking") until a decrease of the objective function is observed that adequately corresponds to the amount of decrease that is expected, based on the step size and the local gradient of the objective function. The stopping criterion is known as the Armijo–Goldstein condition.

Backtracking line search is typically used for gradient descent (GD), but it can also be used in other contexts. For example, it can be used with Newton's method if the Hessian matrix is positive definite.

Motivation
This is because the computing resources needed to find a more precise minimum along one particular direction could instead be employed to identify a better search direction. Once an improved starting point has been identified by the line search, another subsequent line search will ordinarily be performed in a new direction.

The shrinking continues until a value is found that is small enough to provide a decrease in the objective function that adequately matches the decrease that is expected to be achieved, based on the local function gradient 

It is assumed that  is a vector for which some local decrease is possible, i.e., it is assumed that .

Based on a selected control parameter , the Armijo–Goldstein condition tests whether a step-wise movement from a current position
 to a modified position  achieves an adequately corresponding decrease in the objective function. The condition is fulfilled, see , if 

This condition, when used appropriately as part of a line search, can ensure that the step size is not excessively large. However, this condition is not sufficient on its own to ensure that the step size is nearly optimal, since any value of  that is sufficiently small will satisfy the condition.

Thus, the backtracking line search strategy starts with a relatively large step size, and repeatedly shrinks it by a factor  until the Armijo–Goldstein condition is fulfilled.

Algorithm
 Set  and iteration counter .
 Until the condition is satisfied that  repeatedly increment  and set 
 Return  as the solution.

Function minimization using backtracking line search in practice 

The detailed steps are thus, see , :
 Choose an initial starting point  and set the iteration counter .

A precise version is as follows (see e.g. ). There are constants  so that the following two conditions are satisfied:
 For all n, . (This assures that if , then also . More generally, if , then also .) A more strict version requires also the reverse inequality:  for a positive constant .
 For all n,  .

Lower bound for learning rates 

This addresses the question whether there is a systematic way to find a positive number  - depending on the function f, the point  and the descent direction   - so that all learning rates  satisfy Armijo's condition. See  for more detail.

Upper bound for learning rates 

For example, in Wolfe conditions, there is no mention of  but another condition called curvature condition is introduced. 

Thus, this result applies for example when one uses Backtracking line search for Morse functions. Note that in dimension 1,   is a number and hence this upper bound is of the same size as the lower bound in the section "Lower bound for learning rates".

On the other hand, if the limit point is degenerate, then learning rates can be unbounded. For example, a modification of backtracking line search known as unbounded backtracking gradient descent (see ) allows the learning rate to be half the size , where  is a constant. Experiments with simple functions such as  show that unbounded backtracking gradient descent converges much faster than the basic version described in the section "Function minimization using backtracking line search in practice".

Time efficiency

An argument against the use of Backtracking line search, in particular in Large scale optimisation, is that satisfying Armijo's condition is expensive. There is a way (so-called Two-way Backtracking) to go around, with good theoretical guarantees and has been tested with good results on deep neural networks, see . (There, one can find also good/stable implementations of Armijo's condition and its combination with some popular algorithms such as Momentum and NAG, on datasets such as Cifar10 and Cifar100.) One observes that if the sequence  converges (as wished when one makes use of an iterative optimisation method), then the sequence of learning rates  should vary little when n is large enough. Here is the detailed algorithm for Two-way Backtracking: At step n

 Set . Set  and iteration counter .
 (Increase learning rate if Armijo's condition is satisfied.) If , then while this condition and the condition that  are satisfied, repeatedly set  and increase j.
 (Otherwise, reduce the learning rate if Armijo's condition is not satisfied.) If in contrast , then until the condition is satisfied that  repeatedly increment  and set 
 Return  for the learning rate .

(In  one can find a description of an algorithm with 1), 3) and 4) above, which was not tested in deep neural networks before the cited paper.)

One can save time further by a hybrid mixture between two-way backtracking and the basic standard gradient descent algorithm. This procedure also has good theoretical guarantee and good test performance. Roughly speaking, we run two-way backtracking a few times, then use the learning rate we get from then unchanged, except if the function value increases. Here is precisely how it is done. One choose in advance a number , and a number .

 Set iteration counter j=0. 
 At the steps , use Two-way Backtracking. 
 At each step k in the set : Set . (So, in this case, use the learning rate  unchanged.) Otherwise, if , use Two-way Backtracking. Increase k by 1 and repeat.
 Increase j by 1.

Theoretical guarantee (for gradient descent) 

Compared with Wolfe's conditions, which is more complicated, Armijo's condition has a better theoretical guarantee. Indeed, so far backtracking line search and its modifications are the most theoretically guaranteed methods among all numerical optimization algorithms concerning convergence to critical points  and avoidance of saddle points, see below. 

Critical points are points where the gradient of the objective function is 0. Local minima are critical points, but there are critical points which are not local minima. An example is saddle points. Saddle points are critical points, at which there are at least one direction where the function is (local) maximum. Therefore, these points are far from being local minima. For example, if a function has at least one saddle point, then it cannot be convex. The relevance of saddle points to optimisation algorithms is that in large scale (i.e. high-dimensional) optimisation, one likely sees more saddle points than minima, see . Hence, a good optimisation algorithm should be able to avoid saddle points. In the setting of deep learning, saddle points are also prevalent, see . Thus, to apply in deep learning, one needs results for non-convex functions.

For convergence to critical points: For example, if the cost function is a real analytic function, then it is shown in  that convergence is guaranteed. The main idea is to use Łojasiewicz inequality which is enjoyed by a real analytic function. For non-smooth functions satisfying Łojasiewicz inequality, the above convergence guarantee is extended, see . In , there is a proof that for every sequence constructed by backtracking line search, a cluster point (i.e. the limit of one subsequence, if the subsequence converges) is a critical point. Here the assumption about compact sublevels is to make sure that one deals with compact sets of the Euclidean space only. In the general case, where  is only assumed to be  and have at most countably many critical points, convergence is guaranteed, see . In the same reference, similarly convergence is guaranteed for other modifications of Backtracking line search (such as Unbounded backtracking gradient descent mentioned in the section "Upper bound for learning rates"), and even if the function has uncountably many critical points still one can deduce some non-trivial facts about convergence behaviour. In the stochastic setting, under the same assumption that the gradient is Lipschitz continuous and one uses a more restrictive version (requiring in addition that the sum of learning rates is infinite and the sum of squares of learning rates is finite) of diminishing learning rate scheme (see section "Stochastic gradient descent") and moreover the function is strictly convex, then the convergence is established in the well-known result , see  for generalisations to less restrictive versions of a diminishing learning rate scheme. None of these results (for non-convex functions) have been proven for any other optimization algorithm so far.

For avoidance of saddle points: For example, if the gradient of the cost function is Lipschitz continuous and one chooses standard GD with learning rate <1/L, then with a random choice of initial point  (more precisely, outside a set of Lebesgue measure zero), the sequence constructed will not converge to a non-degenerate saddle point (proven in ), and more generally it is also true that the sequence constructed will not converge to a degenerate saddle point (proven in ).

A special case: (standard) stochastic gradient descent (SGD) 

While it is trivial to mention, if the gradient of a cost function is Lipschitz continuous, with Lipschitz constant L, then with choosing learning rate to be constant and of the size , one has a special case of backtracking line search (for gradient descent). This scheme however requires that one needs to have a good estimate for L, otherwise if learning rate is too big (relative to 1/L) then the scheme has no convergence guarantee. One can see what will go wrong if the cost function is a smoothing (near the point 0) of the function f(t)=|t|. Such a good estimate is, however, difficult and laborious in large dimensions. Also, if the gradient of the function is not globally Lipschitz continuous, then this scheme has no convergence guarantee.

If one does not care about the condition that learning rate must be bounded by 1/L, then this special scheme has been used much older, at least since 1847 by Cauchy, which can be called standard GD (not to be confused with stochastic gradient descent, which is abbreviated herein as SGD). In the stochastic setting (such as in the mini-batch setting in deep learning), standard GD is called stochastic gradient descent, or SGD.

Even if the cost function has globally continuous gradient, good estimate of the Lipschitz constant for the cost functions in deep learning may not be feasible or desirable, given the very high dimensions of deep neural networks. Hence, there is a technique of fine-tuning of learning rates in applying standard GD or SGD. One way is to choose many learning rates from a grid search, with the hope that some of the learning rates can give good results. Another way is the so-called adaptive standard GD or SGD, some representatives are Adam, Adadelta, RMSProp and so on, see the article on Stochastic gradient descent. In adaptive standard GD or SGD, learning rates are allowed to vary at each iterate step n, but in a different manner from Backtracking line search for gradient descent. Apparently, it would be more expensive to use Backtracking line search for gradient descent, since one needs to do a loop search until Armijo's condition is satisfied, while for adaptive standard GD or SGD no loop search is needed. Most of these adaptive standard GD or SGD do not have the descent property , for all n, as Backtracking line search for gradient descent. Only a few has this property, and which have good theoretical properties, but they turn out to be special cases of Backtracking line search or more generally Armijo's condition .

Practicalities for using in the stochastic setting and implementation in deep neural networks

The algorithm described above is for the deterministic setting, which as reported above has good theoretical guarantees. When one uses Armijo's algorithm in real life settings where random features play important roles, there are practicalities one needs to take care about. This section describes some main points to be noted in the more theoretical setting of stochastic optimization and the more realistic setting of mini-batch in deep neural networks.

1) Stochastic optimization: 

The typical statement of this setting is as follows: Assume that we have a function  depending on a random variable . Now we want to find minimum of the expectation function , here   computes the expectation with respect to the random variable . 

In general, it is very difficult to compute the expectation, in particular when working for example with deep neural networks (see the next part). Therefore, we can only do as follows: 

At step n: choose randomly  variables  (with respect to the given distribution), and replace the (unknown) function  by an approximation . 

It is noted that in general  is allowed to change. There are works which let  increase. The following example explains the motivation for such a scheme (also, see theoretical justification later). However, it will be explained in the section about implementing in deep neural networks that there are difficulties/not very good performance with implementing this scheme. 

Example 1: Consider the simple function , which is convex with a unique critical point . Recall the normal distribution . Then , where  is a random variable with distribution .

So what mentions in Example 1 is not the fault of backtracking itself, but also for SGD, the most studied optimization algorithm.

Example 1'. The same function F(x) and distribution  . Hence, by classical theory, for learning rate , SGD with constant learning rate will converge for F(x). However, one check with Python that for the associated stochastic optimization problem, even with the choice of a smaller learning rate 0.1, one observes divergence to infinity! On the other hand, with the learning rate 0.05 then one observes convergence to the minimum 0. Therefore, it seems that even for this simple function, the choice of (constant) learning rate must take into account the distribution, and not just that from the deterministic function F(x), for to obtain convergence for the stochastic optimization problem. [Note: if here one runs Armijo's Backtracking line search with maximum learning rate , then one observes convergence! Hence, still Armijo's Backtracking line search helps with choosing a good learning rate to use, compared to SGD with constant learning rates.]

A typical theoretical result (in the literature, one may find weaker results than what stated here, either because requiring stronger assumptions or proving weaker conclusions) in this setting is as follows: 

Then both of the following schemes guarantee convergence: Scheme 1: Backtracking with increasing "mini-batch" sizes . Scheme 2: SGD with learning rates decreasing to 0. 

Why these schemes yield not very good experimental results in deep neural networks can be because: 

- The implementation does not take into account the differences between stochastic optimization and deep neural networks (see more in the next section);

and/or 

- The assumptions of these theoretical results are not satisfied (too strong to be satisfied) by the cost functions in deep neural networks.

It is worthy to notice that current successful implementations of backtracking in deep neural networks use constant mini-batch sizes . However, the difference with Example 1 is that one does not choose k_n=1 since that is too small. Indeed, one has the following. 

Example 2. Let the function F(x) and the distribution  be as in Example 1, where . If one chooses  for all n, then one can check with Python that Armijo's backtracking line search with maximum learning rate  in this stochastic setting converges!

This can be explained that in this example, choosing  for all n is not good enough to approximate the function F(x), but choosing  for all n is a good approximation. The same happens with deep neural networks: one needs to choose a big enough mini-batch size depending on the specific question and setting (see next section). People who are familiar with undergraduate calculus can find an analogy in using Riemann sums to approximate an integral.

2) deep neural networks: 

While stochastic optimization is meant to be a theoretical model for what happens in training deep neural networks, in practice there are important differences in many aspects: assumptions, resources, ways to proceed and goals. 

Assumptions: in stochastic optimization, among many others, there is usually the requirement that the cost function is (strongly-)convex. This is hardly satisfied or verified in practice.

Summary 

In summary, backtracking line search (and its modifications) is a method which is easy to implement, is applicable for very general functions, has very good theoretical guarantee (for both convergence to critical points and avoidance of saddle points) and works well in practice. Several other methods which have good theoretical guarantee, such as diminishing learning rates or standard GD with learning rate <1/L – both require the gradient of the objective function to be Lipschitz continuous, turn out to be a special case of Backtracking line search or satisfy Armijo's condition.

See also
Gradient descent
Stochastic gradient descent
Wolfe conditions

References
 
 
 
 
 
 
 
 
 
 
 
 
 
 
 

Mathematical optimization
Optimization algorithms and methods